Jason Wagener (born 2 June 1997) is a South African cricketer. He made his Twenty20 debut for KwaZulu-Natal in the 2017 Africa T20 Cup on 8 September 2017. He made his List A debut for KwaZulu-Natal in the 2017–18 CSA Provincial One-Day Challenge on 15 October 2017. He made his first-class debut on 31 October 2019, for KwaZulu-Natal in the 2019–20 CSA 3-Day Provincial Cup.

References

External links
 

1997 births
Living people
South African cricketers
KwaZulu-Natal cricketers
Place of birth missing (living people)